The Pierce Range is a small very steep-sided mountain range on central Vancouver Island, British Columbia, Canada. It has an area of 94 km2 and is a subrange of the Vancouver Island Ranges which in turn form part of the Insular Mountains.

See also
List of mountain ranges

References

Vancouver Island Ranges
Mountain ranges of British Columbia